Weldon City School District or Weldon City Schools is a school district headquartered in Weldon, North Carolina.

 it, along with the Halifax County School District, has a student body that is almost all of races other than non-Hispanic white, while the student body of Roanoke Rapids Graded School District is 70% white.

Schools
 Weldon STEM High Career Academies (Weldon High School)
 Weldon Middle School
 Weldon Elementary Global Academy
 Roanoke Valley Early College

References

External links
 Weldon City School District
School districts in North Carolina
Education in Halifax County, North Carolina